Vangelis (1943–2022) was a Greek composer of new age and electronic music.

Vangelis may also refer to:
 Vangelis (wrestler) (born 1981), Mexican professional wrestler
 Vangelis (given name), includes a list of people with the given name
 Lambros Vangelis (born 1982), Greek football midfielder
 6354 Vangelis, a main-belt asteroid